Club Baloncesto Granada, S.A.D. was a professional basketball team based in Granada, Andalusia. The team was founded in 1994 and has had notable players during its history, including Curtis Borchardt, Darvin Ham, Giorgos Sigalas, Scott Padgett, Pops Mensah-Bonsu, Richard Hendrix, and Joe Ingles.

Team history

The origins
The current club has its origins in the old Club Asociación Baloncesto Granada, which in turn was the continuation of the Club de Amigos del Baloncesto de Loja, who covered during some time the vacuum left by the late CD Oximesa.
On June 28, 1994, the lawyer José Luis Lopez Cantal form, with the company of a board, the Club Asociación Baloncesto Granada, which campaigned for a year on the newly created Liga Española de Baloncesto Amateur (Liga EBA). The team did not achieve the desired rise in its first season, but in the 1995-96 season, after an exceptional competition, it was proclaimed champion in the final eight disputed in Lugo. Although during that year it had been agreed that there would be no promotions, the CB Granada, in a joint operation with the city, bought the spot of Baloncesto Salamanca (agreement closed on June 14 by 400 million pesetas plus VAT), which allow for first time play in the ACB, which demanded their transformation into joint stock company sports. Thus, the club became Club Baloncesto Granada SAD.

The arrival in the elite

In the first incursion into the elite (96-97), José Alberto Pesquera as coach, 'Cebé' also disputed the Korać Cup (right acquired with the purchase of Salamanca), which reached the sweet sixteen: eliminated by the Banco di Roma (88-70 at the Palacio de los Deportes and 94-65 at the Palasport). In the domestic competition concluded in the thirteenth place.

The next season (1997–98) began with Pedro Martínez as a coach, but the results were not accompanied and he ended up being replaced by Antonio Gomez Nieto before the start of play off for the relegation. In the final series before the Ciudad de Huelva, the excitement would persist until the last meeting, which was held in the Palacio de los Deportes, where John Williams score a 'coast to coast' winning basket. The chairman and was then Carlos Marsá, which had acquired almost all the shares of the entity.

For the new financial year (1998–99) the club hired Miguel Angel Martin, although he ended resigning because of his disagreements with the president and the administration of the club. The team was plunged into a desperate situation. The coordinator of quarry, David Cardenas, went to the bench, while his stock of 0 wins and 6 defeats forced to seek, to the desperate, a coach with experience: Iñaki Iriarte. However, the team did not lift his head and fell, along with Murcia, the LEB.

Climb on the court
Subsequently, the CB Granada tried nurtured players top level, but the season (1999–2000) again prove baleful: Iriarte, personal problems, presented his resignation, which caused the interim Enrique Gutierrez and the subsequent hiring of José Alberto Pesquera, nor would finish its work (dismissal after a pitiful defeat in Córdoba, against Cajasur). So, the leaders opted again by Antonio Gomez Nieto to reach port as dignified as possible: eliminated in the elite eight by the CB Murcia.

For the attempt to climb back (2000–01), it appeared that Gomez Nieto (coach) and Gutierrez (sports director) had succeeded in forming a template guarantees (the first regional title in the history of the club, the Andalusian League, winning Caja San Fernando in the semifinals and Unicaja in the final), but the economic problems crossed the road. But, the survivors found-in a display of effort, confidence and unity-qualify for the playoffs as a fourth classified. They beat Inca and faced in semifinals with Menorca, which had beaten the big favorite (León), and the stadium factor favouring the Andalusians. And again in a final and dramatic party the team promoted.

Gomez Nieto remained as coach in the return and, with a staff of some level and right mix of youth and vets, materialized stay comfortably (since the fourteenth), with victories at FC Barcelona, Pamesa Valencia, Caja San Fernando or Real Madrid and the individual records of Nacho Ordín (98.2% shooting, with a series of 53/54) and Oriol Junyent (Spanish first in the history of averaging double figures in rebounds: 10.5) for the memory.

Unfortunately that any change in a few months. In the 2002-03 campaign team was not as effective as in the past and various changes in the team destabilized it further. The coach stopped in office and Sergio Valdeolmillos replaced him, inadequate measure despite the visible improvement in play and attitude. The team got their first victory against Adecco Estudiantes, but couldn't avoid relegation.

New challenge, then, in the LEB, with Sergio Valdeolmillos as coach and Oriol Humet in the office. Despite a track record with some ups and downs, the key-arrive at the best time to play-off was achieved, and once left by the wayside the UB La Palma, occurred the great grief of templates and hobbies (Granada - Zaragoza) whose denouement, in the crash tiebreaker again ended in a joy throughout the city.

2004–2011: The consolidation in ACB
The new era in ACB, starts with the definition of a medium-term project that will lead the club to settle permanently in the national basketball elite. Since then, great players have been part of this project of consolidation with one in particular: Curtis Borchardt. CB Granada starts every season with renewed hopes ant the same strengths in its objectives: To continue to grow with firm steps.

But on 2010–11 season, the huge debts and a poor planning of the team led to the relegation of CB Granada to the relegation to LEB Oro after seven years at Liga ACB.

Comeback to LEB and dissolution
After the 2011 relegation, CB Granada played on LEB Oro with several economic problems, and despite a good start, the lack of budget caused the march of several players and several losses. In December 2011, the Board of the club announced CB Granada will be dissolved after the end of the season.

CB Granada finished the 2011-12 league in the last position and was relegated to LEB Plata after being defeated in the last game by Clínicas Rincón Benahavís 71–61. Days later, the club officially required the stoppage. Finally, on May 5, the club was officially dissolved.

Despite the dissolution of the team, the Fundación CB Granada, which previously worked with CB Granada, started to play in Regional leagues.

Sponsorship naming
CB Granada had several denominations through the years due to its sponsorship:
SPAR Granada: 1994–96
Covirán Sierra Nevada: 1996–98
Covirán Cervezas Alhambra: 1998–99

Players

Coaches

Antonio Gómez Nieto 1994–1996, 1998, 2000–2003
José Alberto Pesquera 1996–1997, 2000
Pedro Martínez 1997–1998
Miguel Ángel Martín 1998–1999
David Cárdenas 1999
Iñaki Irirarte 1999–2000
Kike Gutiérrez 2000
Sergio Valdeolmillos 2003–2008
Trifón Poch 2008–2011
Curro Segura 2011–12
Miguel Ángel Zapata 2012

Season by season

Accomplishments and awards

Honours
2nd division championships: (1)
Liga EBA: (1) 1996
Supercopa: (0)
 runner-up 2005
Andalusia Cup: (3)
2000, 2004, 2006

Individual awards
ACB Rising Star
Richard Hendrix – 2010

ACB Slam Dunk Champion
Jerod Ward – 2003

References

External links
CB Granada Official Website
Roster on ACB.com

 
Former Liga ACB teams
Basketball teams established in 1994
Defunct basketball teams in Spain
Sport in Granada
Basketball teams disestablished in 2012
Former LEB Oro teams
Former Liga EBA teams
1994 establishments in Spain
2012 disestablishments in Spain
Basketball teams in Andalusia